Phallus granulosodenticulatus is a species of fungus belonging to the Phallus genus. It was discovered in 1832.

References 

Phallales